Gonatostylis is a genus of flowering plants from the orchid family, Orchidaceae. It contains only two species, both endemic to New Caledonia.

Gonatostylis bougainvillei N.Hallé
Gonatostylis vieillardii (Rchb.f.) Schltr.

See also 
 List of Orchidaceae genera

References 

  (1906) Botanische Jahrbücher für Systematik, Pflanzengeschichte und Pflanzengeographie 39: 56.
  (2003). Genera Orchidacearum 3: 135 ff. Oxford University Press.
  2005. Handbuch der Orchideen-Namen. Dictionary of Orchid Names. Dizionario dei nomi delle orchidee. Ulmer, Stuttgart

External links 

Cranichideae genera
Orchids of New Caledonia
Endemic flora of New Caledonia
Goodyerinae